Sceliphron curvatum, also known as the Asian mud-dauber wasp, is an insect in the genus Sceliphron of the wasp family Sphecidae. Like all wasps of this genus, it is a solitary species and builds nests out of mud. S. curvatum is native to some regions of Asia and invasive to Europe.

Description

It builds nests of mud on the walls of buildings, but also very often indoors on piles of books, clothes or pieces of furniture. Every nest is filled with paralyzed spiders, which serve as food for the larvae. Like all Sceliphron species, S. curvatum is not aggressive unless threatened.

Distribution

Formerly, the species was distributed in India, Nepal, Pakistan, Kazakhstan and Tadjikistan in submontaneous regions at the highest mountain ranges of the world: Himalayas, Karakoram and Pami. It was first recorded in Europe in 1979, when a female was collected near the village of Grätsch in southeastern Austria. It is assumed that S. curvatum was introduced to Europe as a result of human activity, but after that the species has been spreading throughout Europe on its own. S. curvatum has been quickly enlarging its range, forming mighty populations in anthropogenous localities (towns, villages) in southern and central Europe. Since 1979 the species has expanded to several other European countries: Slovenia, Italy, Croatia, Switzerland, France, Hungary, Germany, Serbia, Montenegro, Greece, Czech Republic, Spain, Slovakia, Ukraine, Portugal, Poland and Romania.

It has spread to North America. It was first reported in 2013, and it has spread to several states.

References

Sphecidae
Hymenoptera of Asia
Insects described in 1870